{{Infobox film
| name           = Mystery Mansion
| image          = Mystery Mansion film.png
| image_size     =
| caption        = DVD cover
| director       = David E. Jackson
| producer       = Arthur R. Dubs
| writer         = Jack DugganDavid JacksonArn Wihtol
| starring       = Dal McKennonGreg WynneRandi Brown
| music          = William LooseJack K. TillarMarty Wereski
| cinematography = Milas C. Hinshaw
| editing        = 
| distributor    = Pacific International Enterprises
| released       = {{Film date|1983| | |ref1=<ref>[https://web.archive.org/web/20080521165803/http://movies.nytimes.com/movie/34204/Mystery-Mansion/overview New York Times - Mystery Mansion (1983)]</ref>}}
| runtime        = 95 minutes
| country        = United States
| language       = English
| budget         =
}}Mystery Mansion'' is a 1983 family film directed by David E. Jackson and starring Dal McKennon, Greg Wynne and Randi Brown.

Plot
Susan (Randi Brown) and her brother Johnny (David Wagner) come across an old map that may be a clue in finding gold, while staying at their aunt and uncle's house. Susan has been having nightmares about Rachel, a young girl who vanished in 1889 from a nearby mansion when her parents were killed by bank robbers. The siblings make friends with Billy and soon began their search for the treasure as well as find out what happened to Rachel.

Main cast
 Dal McKennon as Sam
 Greg Wynne as Gene
 Randi Brown as Susan
 David Wagner as Johnny
 Riley Novak as Billy
 Jane Ferguson as Mary

DVD details
Release date: January 1, 2003
Full Screen
Region: 1
Aspect Ratio: 1.33:1
Audio tracks: English
Subtitles: English, Spanish
Running time: 95 minutes

References

External links

Official Site

1983 films
American children's adventure films
American children's drama films
1983 drama films
Treasure hunt films
1980s English-language films
1980s American films